This Machine is the eighth studio album by American rock band The Dandy Warhols. It was released on April 24, 2012 by record label The End. The album features a more stripped-down, laid-back style than much of the band's previous work.

Background and recording 

While playing at Sydney's Enmore Theatre in May 2011 as part of their 2011 Australian tour, lead singer Courtney Taylor-Taylor announced the new album would be titled This Machine and is to be released in February 2012 (Taylor-Taylor had previously jokingly announced it as The Pastor of Muppets, Shitty Shitty Band Band or Whirled Piece in blog posts on the band's official website). On the same tour, the band debuted two new songs which would later appear on the album, "Seti vs. the Wow! Signal" and "Rest Your Head".

This Machine was recorded between May to November 2011.

The band collaborated with ex-Bauhaus member David J on the track "The Autumn Carnival"; J co-wrote the song and supplied backing vocals and bass guitar to the track.

Release 

The band announced the release of the album's first single, "Well They're Gone", on their website on March 1, 2012, allowing visitors to download the track for free after entering their email address. A music video for the track "Sad Vacation" was released to YouTube on April 20.

This Machine was released on April 24, 2012.

Critical reception 

The album has received a mixed response from critics. Benjamin Aspray of PopMatters wrote "Like reformed alcoholics who were more fun when they drank, This Machine is alternately sullen and unconvincingly earnest, and inoffensive to a fault. [...] As the appropriately titled The Dandy Warhols Are Sound—the pre-Nick Rhodes version of Welcome to the Monkey House—made abundantly clear, a stripping down does not become them. They're an object lesson in self-conscious style as substance, and that's the fun of it!" Pitchfork gave it a 5.1/10 grade, their highest rating for a Dandy Warhols since 1997's ...The Dandy Warhols Come Down, calling it "the most sober Dandy Warhols album to date, reining in the stoner rock sprawl, the curled-lip snark and bad puns endemic to so many Dandys releases", but "an all-too-fitting descriptor of a band going through the motions", commenting that frontman Courtney Taylor-Taylor "just sounds bored". The A.V. Club called it "an undistinguished slog of an album".

AllMusic, on the other hand, gave it a positive review, writing "It's the closest the band has come yet to something genuinely uplifting and irony-free – no small feat for these tongue-in-cheek provocateurs, but This Machine suggests that the Dandy Warhols are actually improving with age, which is an even bigger accomplishment." Stephen Dalton in his review for the magazine Classic Rock writes that the band sounds "refreshed and rebooted" and the album "is possibly their best yet", despite ultimately being "a triumph of inventive arrangements and lush production over songwriting."

Track listing

Personnel 

 The Dandy Warhols

 Courtney Taylor-Taylor – vocals and electric guitar
 Peter Holmström – electric guitar and backing vocals
 Zia McCabe – keyboards
 Brent DeBoer – drums, percussion and backing vocals

 Additional personnel

 David J – backing vocals and bass guitar on "The Autumn Carnival"
 Steve Berlin – baritone saxophone on "16 Tons"
 Kat Gardiner – Theremin on "Well They're Gone"
 Daniel Lamb – trombone on "I Am Free"
 Katie Presley – trumpet on "I Am Free"
 Taylor Aglipay – tenor saxophone on "I Am Free"

 Technical

 Tchad Blake – mixing
 Jeremy Sherrer – engineering at The Odditorium 
 Tim Johnston – Drums, backing vocals recorded at Coloursound Recording Studio, Melbourne, Australia)
 Mat Robins – engineering
 Adam Ayan – mastering at Gateway Mastering, Portland, Maine 
 Sean Gothman – album design and layout
 Hickory Mertasching – album cover painting
 Dan Kivitka – album cover photography
 Steve Birch – additional album cover production
 Elliot Lee Hazel – sleeve band portraits

References

External links 

 
 Album information at Slabtown.net

The Dandy Warhols albums
2012 albums
The End Records albums